The following is a List of Breton poets.

In Breton
 Charles de Gaulle
 Meavenn
 Roparz Hemon
 Per-Jakez Helias

In French
 Tristan Corbière
 Xavier Grall
 Max Jacob
 Alfred Jarry
 Victor Segalen

In English
 Claire Trévien

 

Poetry-related lists
French literature-related lists